Mumiksaa (Inuktitut syllabics: ᒧᒥᒃᓵ) formerly Frechette Island is a member of the Arctic Archipelago in the territory of Nunavut. Qimivvik lies to its north.

References

Islands of Baffin Island
Uninhabited islands of Qikiqtaaluk Region